The Ieud is a left tributary of the river Iza in Romania. It discharges into the Iza in the village Ieud, near Bogdan Vodă.

References

Rivers of Romania
Rivers of Maramureș County